The West Wales FA Senior Cup was the regional knock-out competition for the higher ranked clubs beneath the umbrella of the West Wales Football Association until its end in 2009. It has been replaced with the WWFA Intermediate Cup, a tournament for clubs below Tier 3 in the Welsh football pyramid that play in West Wales. 

The cup was open to clubs competing in the Welsh Football League, the League of Wales / Welsh Premier League following its formation in 1992, and also Swansea City. In later years the Senior Cup winners of the county leagues – Carmarthenshire, Neath & District, Pembrokeshire and Swansea – would be invited to take part.

Teams from outside the west Wales region – Barry, Bridgend Town, Merthyr Tydfil and Newport County – also reached early finals. The West Wales FA was affiliated to the South Wales FA until 1968, which allowed clubs from the latter association entrance to this competition.

Swansea City are by far the most successful team in the competition – winning the trophy 25 times in 38 finals, including one sharing of the competition with Llanelli in 1963 – but during the later years they would predominantly field a weakened team composed of reserve and youth players. They last competed in the 2005–06 competition.

The last Senior Cup final – Reds take the plaudits

Llanelli were the last side to clinch the Senior Cup with a comprehensive 5–2 victory over West End in 2009.

An upset was on the cards as Welsh League outfit West End raced into a 2–0 first-half lead, only for Jordan Follows to pull one back for the Reds on the stroke of half-time.

But in the second-half the floodgates opened. Stephen Crabbe's red card didn't help West End's cause and strikes from Stuart Jones, Mark Pritchard (2) and captain Rhys Griffiths ensured that the trophy would return to Stebonheath Park for the tenth and final time.

Competition Winners

References

Football cup competitions in Wales
Football in Wales
County Cup competitions
Recurring events established in 1923
1923 establishments in Wales